Galcerán Bridge is a bridge in Santa Cruz de Tenerife, Tenerife, Canary Islands, Spain. Conceived in 1904, it was constructed between 1926 and 1928, and officially opened on 19 October 1928 during a visit of Miguel Primo de Rivera to Tenerife. It was the third bridge to span the Barranco de Santos. It was refurbished in 2018.

History 

The bridge was conceived in 1904 by engineer Gudalfajaro, and it was constructed using a loan taken out by the Santa Cruz government when Santiago García Sanabria was mayor. The bridge was designed by architect Antonio Pintor and engineer Eduardo Torroja.

Acquisition of land for the bridge began in February 1926. At the time it belonged to Mr Cejas and Mr Montesdeoca, and was purchased for 10 pesetas per square metre. There was a controversy that the construction of the bridge could affect the newly built .

Construction started on 7 June 1926. It was built by Construcciones Hidráulicas y Civiles SA at the cost of 638,438 pesetas. The 10 streetlights installed on it were bought from Seville at the cost of 3,750 pesetas. During construction, worker Benito Martín González died when he fell from the arches to the bottom of the ravine; there were also other accidents during construction.

The official opening was at 5 p.m. on 19 October 1928, as part of the visit of Prime Minister Miguel Primo de Rivera to Tenerife. When it opened, it was the third bridge to cross the Santos ravine.

Structure 
While it originally had  railings, these were replaced in 1954 with  railings atop a parapet to limit the number of suicides from the bridge.

It was renovated in 2018. Work started in April 2018 and lasted five months, costing €1.7 million. The preventative work included improving and reinforcing the bridge structure and cladding. Historical information panels were also installed under the lamp posts.

References 

Buildings and structures in Santa Cruz de Tenerife
Bridges in the Canary Islands
Bridges completed in 1928